Jack Montrose Sextet is an album by saxophonist Jack Montrose, recorded in 1955 for the Pacific Jazz label.

Reception

The AllMusic reviewer, Scott Yanow, states: "Montrose's charts (which are full of unexpected surprises while always swinging and leaving room for plenty of solos) are quite notable and show that, despite the restrained tones, there was plenty of excitement to be found in West Coast jazz".

Track listing
All compositions by Jack Montrose except as indicated
 "Listen Hear" - 5:32
 "Bewitched, Bothered and Bewildered" (Richard Rodgers, Lorenz Hart) - 5:26
 "Some Good Fun Blues" - 5:06
 "Fools Rush In" (Rube Bloom, Johnny Mercer) - 5:33
 "Speakeasy" - 4:11
 "Credo" - 5:24
 "Pretty" - 5:16
 "That Old Feeling" (Sammy Fain, Lew Brown) - 4:27

Personnel 
Jack Montrose - tenor saxophone, arranger
Conte Candoli - trumpet 
Bob Gordon - baritone saxophone
Paul Moer - piano
Ralph Pena - bass
Shelly Manne - drums

References 

1955 albums
Pacific Jazz Records albums
Jack Montrose albums